The 1948 Republican National Convention was held at the Municipal Auditorium, in Philadelphia, Pennsylvania, from June 21 to 25, 1948.

New York Governor Thomas E. Dewey had paved the way to win the Republican presidential nomination in the primary elections, where he had beaten former Minnesota Governor Harold E. Stassen and World War II General Douglas MacArthur. In Philadelphia he was nominated on the third ballot over opposition from die-hard conservative Ohio Senator Robert A. Taft, the future "minister of peace" Stassen, Michigan Senator Arthur Vandenberg, and California Governor Earl Warren. In all Republican conventions since 1948, the nominee has been selected on the first ballot. Warren was nominated for vice president. The Republican ticket of Dewey and Warren went on to lose the general election to the Democratic ticket of Harry S. Truman and Alben W. Barkley.  One of the decisive factors in convening both major party conventions in Philadelphia that year was that Philadelphia was hooked up to the coaxial cable, giving the ability for two of the three then-young television networks, NBC and CBS, to telecast for the first time live gavel-to-gavel coverage along the East Coast. Only a few minutes of kinescope film have survived of these historic, live television broadcasts.

Platform
The party platform formally adopted at the convention included the following points:
 Reduction of the public debt
 Reduction of the inheritance tax
 Labor reform
 Promotion of small business through reduction of governmental intervention and regulation.
 Elimination of unnecessary federal bureaus, and duplication of functions of necessary governmental agencies.
 Federal aid to states for slum clearance and low-cost housing
 Extension of Social Security benefits
 A federal anti-lynching law
 Federal civil rights legislation. Texas delegate Orville Bullington led a successful protest demanding southern representation on the platform panel considering the civil rights proposals.
 Abolition of the poll tax
 A crackdown on domestic Communism
 Recognition of the state of Israel
 International arms control "on basis of reliable disciplines against bad faith".
 The admissions of Alaska, Hawaii, and Puerto Rico as states to the union.

Candidates before the convention
 Businessman Riley A. Bender of Illinois
 Speaker of the House Joseph William Martin Jr. of Massachusetts

Balloting

As of 2020, this was the last Republican Convention to go past the first ballot.

Vice Presidential nomination
Dewey had a long list of potential running mates, including his 1944 running mate, Senator John Bricker of Ohio, Representative Charles Halleck of Indiana, former Governor Harold Stassen of Minnesota, and California Governor Earl Warren.  

Dewey chose Warren, who was subsequently nominated by acclaimation. 

The Dewey–Warren ticket was the last to consist of two current or former state Governors until 2016, when former governors Gary Johnson and Bill Weld ran on the Libertarian Party ticket.

See also
 History of the United States Republican Party
 List of Republican National Conventions
 1948 Democratic National Convention
 1948 United States presidential election

References

External links
 Republican Party platform of 1948 at The American Presidency Project
 Dewey acceptance speech at The American Presidency Project
 Video of Dewey acceptance speech for President (via YouTube)

Republican National Conventions
Republican National Convention
Political conventions in Philadelphia
Old Right (United States)
Republican National Convention
Republican National Convention
Republican National Convention